Strike the Blood is an anime series adapted from the light novel series of the same title written by Gakuto Mikumo with illustrations by Manyako. The second OVA series based on the 9th light novel, co-produced by Silver Link and Connect and with returning director Hideyo Yamamoto, was released between November 21, 2016, and May 24, 2017.


Episode list

References

Strike the Blood episode lists
2016 Japanese television seasons
2017 Japanese television seasons